The Drill is an international chart topping house music record written produced and performed by electronic music pioneer and Israeli-born UK producer Matt Schwartz. He is also responsible for hits under his "Dada" and "Deepest Blue" and M'Black guises.
Popular again in 2021 in Poland, due to an emerging meme "Drill Alert".

Discography

Studio albums
The Drill (2005)

Singles
 "The Drill" (2005) The Drill
 "One More Night" (2005) The Drill
 "Queen Bee" (2006) The Drill
 "Piano Mano" (2008) The Drill Ft. Firetruck and Antarctica (as Matt Schwartz)

Remixes
 The Similou - All this love (2006)
 ou-est-le-swimming-pool dance the way I feel (2010)

References

External links
 
 
 The Drill on Myspace
 The Drill on dj downloads
 Dance the way I feel remix

British electronic musicians
Club DJs
Musicians from London
1971 births
Living people
British house musicians
British DJs
Electronic dance music DJs